Mendelevium (101Md) is a synthetic element, and thus a standard atomic weight cannot be given. Like all artificial elements, it has no stable isotopes. The first isotope to be synthesized was 256Md (which was also the first isotope of any element produced one atom at a time) in 1955. There are 17 known radioisotopes, ranging in atomic mass from 244Md to 260Md, and 5 isomers. The longest-lived isotope is 258Md with a half-life of 51.3 days, and the longest-lived isomer is 258mMd with a half-life of 57 minutes.

List of isotopes 

|-
| 244Md
|  style="text-align:right" | 101
|  style="text-align:right" | 143
|
| 
| α
| 240Es

|-
| rowspan=2|245Md
| rowspan=2 style="text-align:right" | 101
| rowspan=2 style="text-align:right" | 144
| rowspan=2|245.08081(33)#
| rowspan=2|0.90(25) ms
| SF
| (various)
| rowspan=2|(1/2−)#
|-
| α (rare)
| 241Es
|-
| rowspan=2 style="text-indent:1em" | 245mMd
| rowspan=2 colspan="3" style="text-indent:2em" | 200(100)# keV
| rowspan=2|400(200) ms[0.35(+23−16) s]
| α
| 241Es
| rowspan=2|(7/2+)
|-
| β+ (rare)
| 245Fm
|-
| rowspan=2|246Md
| rowspan=2 style="text-align:right" | 101
| rowspan=2 style="text-align:right" | 145
| rowspan=2|246.08171(28)#
| rowspan=2|1.0(4) s
| α
| 242Es
| rowspan=2|
|-
| β+ (rare)
| 246Fm
|-
| rowspan=2|247Md
| rowspan=2 style="text-align:right" | 101
| rowspan=2 style="text-align:right" | 146
| rowspan=2|247.08152(22)#
| rowspan=2|1.12(22) s
| SF
| (various)
| rowspan=2|1/2−#
|-
| α (rare)
| 243Es
|-
| rowspan=2 style="text-indent:1em" | 247mMd
| rowspan=2 colspan="3" style="text-indent:2em" |
| rowspan=2|~0.2 s
| α (99.99%)
| 243Es
| rowspan=2|
|-
| SF (10−4%)
| (various)
|-
| rowspan=3|248Md
| rowspan=3 style="text-align:right" | 101
| rowspan=3 style="text-align:right" | 147
| rowspan=3|248.08282(26)#
| rowspan=3|7(3) s
| β+ (80%)
| 248Fm
| rowspan=3|
|-
| α (20%)
| 244Es
|-
| β+, SF (.05%)
| (various)
|-
| rowspan=2|249Md
| rowspan=2 style="text-align:right" | 101
| rowspan=2 style="text-align:right" | 148
| rowspan=2|249.08291(22)#
| rowspan=2|24(4) s
| α (60%)
| 245Es
| rowspan=2|(7/2−)
|-
| β+ (40%)
| 249Fm
|-
| style="text-indent:1em" | 249mMd
| colspan="3" style="text-indent:2em" | 100(100)# keV
| 1.9(9) s
|
|
| (1/2−)
|-
| rowspan=3|250Md
| rowspan=3 style="text-align:right" | 101
| rowspan=3 style="text-align:right" | 149
| rowspan=3|250.08442(32)#
| rowspan=3|52(6) s
| β+ (93%)
| 250Fm
| rowspan=3|
|-
| α (7%)
| 246Es
|-
| β+, SF (.02%)
| (various)
|-
| rowspan=2|251Md
| rowspan=2 style="text-align:right" | 101
| rowspan=2 style="text-align:right" | 150
| rowspan=2|251.084774(20)
| rowspan=2|4.0(5) min
| β+ (90%)
| 251Fm
| rowspan=2|7/2−#
|-
| α (10%)
| 247Es
|-
| rowspan=2|252Md
| rowspan=2 style="text-align:right" | 101
| rowspan=2 style="text-align:right" | 151
| rowspan=2|252.08643(14)#
| rowspan=2|2.3(8) min
| β+ (50%)
| 252Fm
| rowspan=2|
|-
| α (50%)
| 248Es
|-
| rowspan=2|253Md
| rowspan=2 style="text-align:right" | 101
| rowspan=2 style="text-align:right" | 152
| rowspan=2|253.08714(3)#
| rowspan=2|12(8) min[6(+12−3) min]
| β+
| 253Fm
| rowspan=2|7/2−#
|-
| α
| 249Es
|-
| rowspan=2|254Md
| rowspan=2 style="text-align:right" | 101
| rowspan=2 style="text-align:right" | 153
| rowspan=2|254.08959(11)#
| rowspan=2|10(3) min
| β+
| 254Fm
| rowspan=2|(0−)
|-
| α (rare)
| 250Es
|-
| rowspan=2 style="text-indent:1em" | 254mMd
| rowspan=2 colspan="3" style="text-indent:2em" | 50(100)# keV
| rowspan=2|28(8) min
| β+
| 254Fm
| rowspan=2|(3−)
|-
| α (rare)
| 250Es
|-
| rowspan=3|255Md
| rowspan=3 style="text-align:right" | 101
| rowspan=3 style="text-align:right" | 154
| rowspan=3|255.091084(7)
| rowspan=3|27(2) min
| β+ (92%)
| 255Fm
| rowspan=3|(7/2−)
|-
| α (8%)
| 251Es
|-
| SF (.15%)
| (various)
|-
| rowspan=2|256Md
| rowspan=2 style="text-align:right" | 101
| rowspan=2 style="text-align:right" | 155
| rowspan=2|256.09389(13)#
| rowspan=2|77(2) min
| β+ (89%)
| 256Fm
| rowspan=2|(1−)
|-
| α (11%)
| 252Es
|-
| rowspan=3|257Md
| rowspan=3 style="text-align:right" | 101
| rowspan=3 style="text-align:right" | 156
| rowspan=3|257.0955424(29)
| rowspan=3|5.52(5) h
| EC (84.8%)
| 257Fm
| rowspan=3|(7/2−)
|-
| α (15.2%)
| 253Es
|-
| SF (1%)
| (various)
|-
| rowspan=3|258Md
| rowspan=3 style="text-align:right" | 101
| rowspan=3 style="text-align:right" | 157
| rowspan=3|258.098431(5)
| rowspan=3|51.5(3) d
| α (99.99%)
| 254Es
| rowspan=3|(8−)#
|-
| β− (.0015%)
| 258No
|-
| β+ (.0015%)
| 258Fm
|-
| rowspan=4 style="text-indent:1em" | 258mMd
| rowspan=4 colspan="3" style="text-indent:2em" | 0(200)# keV
| rowspan=4|57.0(9) min
| EC (70%)
| 258Fm
| rowspan=4|1−#
|-
| SF (20%)
| (various)
|-
| β− (10%)
| 258No
|-
| α (1.2%)
| 254Es
|-
| rowspan=2|259Md
| rowspan=2 style="text-align:right" | 101
| rowspan=2 style="text-align:right" | 158
| rowspan=2|259.10051(22)#
| rowspan=2|1.60(6) h
| SF (98.7%)
| (various)
| rowspan=2|7/2−#
|-
| α (1.3%)
| 255Es
|-
| rowspan=4|260Md
| rowspan=4 style="text-align:right" | 101
| rowspan=4 style="text-align:right" | 159
| rowspan=4|260.10365(34)#
| rowspan=4|27.8(8) d
| SF (85%)
| (various)
| rowspan=4|
|-
| α (5%)
| 256Es
|-
| EC (5%)
| 260Fm
|-
| β− (3.5%)
| 260No

Chronology of isotope discovery

References 

 Isotope masses from:

 Isotopic compositions and standard atomic masses from:

 Half-life, spin, and isomer data selected from the following sources.

 
Mendelevium
Mendelevium